Essex is a small unincorporated community in San Bernardino County, California. Essex lies on Old National Trails Highway – part of the old Route 66 – just south of Interstate 40 in the Mojave Desert.

History
Essex, a former oasis along historic Route 66 in California, was allegedly founded when a motorist suffered a flat tire only to discover there were no garages for miles.  It also lies along the former Atchison, Topeka and Santa Fe Railway (now the BNSF Railway).

In Essex's heyday, there were a number of important buildings utilized by motorists and local patrons, including:
 Bell's Towing
 The Wayside Cafe
 Essex Post Office
 Essex Elementary School
 Essex Shell Tire Shop

Essex was notable along Route 66 for providing free water to travelers, thanks to a well installed by the Automobile Club of Southern California. Over a dozen homes also serviced the small community.

The town of Essex had no television reception until 1977. The signal from Los Angeles, 150 miles west, was too weak, and the signal from Las Vegas, 110 miles north, was blocked by hills. A device called a translator, costing several thousand dollars, could have solved this problem, but the town voted against spending the money. Johnny Carson found the town's lack of television interesting, and invited the entire town's population (about 50 people at the time) to attend the taping of the March 25, 1977 episode of The Tonight Show Starring Johnny Carson. He talked to 5 different townspeople about what it was like and whether they missed having television. All but one said they preferred it that way. Shortly after the Tonight Show appearance, executives at Electronics, Missiles and Communications (Emcee), which makes television transmitters, provided the town with a translator at no cost.

Today
With an estimated population of just 89 people in 2005 (down from 111 in 2000), Essex is on the verge of becoming one of many ghost towns scattered throughout the Southwestern United States displaced by the creation of Interstate 40. Essex Elementary school (founded 1937), which once served the educational needs of both Essex and its neighbor Goffs, has closed. It was once taught by a single teacher. Its location remote even with today's technological capabilities, Essex lacks many comforts of modern-day life, and was unable to receive television service until the end of 1977.

Many of the homes and buildings in Essex have completely disappeared, almost 50 lie in abandonment, and of what was once a bustling roadside hub, only the post office, Caltrans maintenance yard, school house, and outdoor telephone are still operational. There are no facilities in town.
 
By 2013, the population had declined to 8-10 people.

Essex has only one close neighbor, the equally abandoned Goffs, located to the north, just across I-40.

Three miles northeast of Essex, just north of the Goffs Road Junction with National Old Trails Highway, the remains of Camp Essex Army Airfield are still visible. This uniquely configured airfield has two parallel runways and twelve "hardstands," where aircraft could be parked.

See also
Camp Essex a World War II training camp near by.

References

Populated places in the Mojave Desert
Ghost towns on U.S. Route 66
Ghost towns in California
Unincorporated communities in San Bernardino County, California
Oases of California
Unincorporated communities in California